The 1954 Estonian SSR Football Championship season was won by Tallinna Dünamo.

League table

References

Estonian Football Championship
Est
Football